Abdelhamid Zouba (2 April 1935 – 2 February 2022) was an Algerian football player and manager who managed the Algeria national team during six separate spells. He was born in Bologhine. He died on 2 February 2022, at the age of 86.

Following a playing career in French Algeria, France, Tunisia and Switzerland, he started his managerial career in Tunisia and Switzerland. He then mainly coached in Algeria, except for spells in Tunisia and Libya.

References

1935 births
2022 deaths
21st-century Algerian people
Algerian footballers
Chamois Niortais F.C. players
US Monastir (football) players
FC Grenchen players
Nîmes Olympique players
USM Bel Abbès players
Ligue 1 players
Association football forwards
Algerian football managers
US Monastir (football) managers
USM Bel Abbès managers
Algeria national football team managers
MC Alger managers
RC Kouba managers
MO Constantine managers
JS Kabylie managers
Stade Tunisien managers
Algerian Ligue Professionnelle 1 managers
Algerian expatriate footballers
Algerian expatriate football managers
Algerian expatriate sportspeople in France
Expatriate footballers in France
Algerian expatriate sportspeople in Tunisia
Expatriate footballers in Tunisia
Expatriate football managers in Tunisia
Algerian expatriate sportspeople in Switzerland
Expatriate footballers in Switzerland
Expatriate football managers in Switzerland
Algerian expatriate sportspeople in Libya
Expatriate football managers in Libya